Braceborough Spa railway station was a station in Braceborough Spa, Lincolnshire on the Bourn and Essendine Railway between Essendine and Bourne. It was closed in 1951, along with the rest of the line.

References

External links
Braceborough Spa Halt on navigable 1946 O.S. map

Disused railway stations in Lincolnshire
Former Great Northern Railway stations
Railway stations in Great Britain opened in 1860
Railway stations in Great Britain closed in 1951